Trawick, Texas is an unincorporated community in Nacogdoches County in the U.S. state of Texas. It is located thirteen miles northwest of the county seat, Nacogdoches near Highway 204. Now with a population of around a hundred, the number of residents peaked at 300 in 1929 when the economy - based on cotton - was thriving.

References

Unincorporated communities in Texas
Unincorporated communities in Nacogdoches County, Texas